6-(2-Aminopropyl)indole (6-API, 6-IT) is an indole derivative which was first identified being sold on the designer drug market by a laboratory in the Czech Republic in July 2016.

Alexander Shulgin says in his book TiHKAL "From the normal 3-position to the 2, the 4, the 5, the 6 or the 7-positions. All five alpha-methyltryptamine isomers are known, but only one is known to be active in man as a CNS active material. This is the 5-isomer, 5-(2-aminopropyl)indole or 5-IT".

Studies in dogs have also shown the drug to increase hemoglobin levels in the bloodstream.

Legality 
 6-API is a positional isomer of αMT, and as such may be covered by the analogue act in the USA (depending on the nature of its psychoactive effect).
 6-API / 6-IT is illegal in the UK, as it was banned as a temporary class drug in June 2013, along with 9 other related compounds. On March 5, 2014 the UK Home Office announced that 6-API would be made a class B drug on 10 June 2014 alongside every other benzofuran entactogen and many structurally related drugs.
 6-API is covered by the Australian analogue act as an analogue of MDA "by the replacement of up to 2 carbocyclic or heterocyclic ring structures with different carbocyclic or heterocyclic ring structures"
6-API is uncontrolled in Germany, as indole rings are not included as rings under the 2-phenethylamine derived section of the NPsG.

References 

Indoles
Stimulants
Entactogens and empathogens
Substituted amphetamines